Mat Robinson (born June 20, 1986) is a Canadian former professional ice hockey defenceman. Robinson played professionally from 2009 to 2022, most notably in Europe. Robinson was named to the Canada men's national ice hockey team for the 2018 Olympic Winter Games.

Playing career
Before turning professional, Robinson attended the University of Alaska Anchorage where he played four seasons of NCAA Division I college hockey with the Alaska Anchorage Seawolves In his final season, Robinson led all UAA defencemen in scoring and was the Seawolves' captain.

At the end of the 2008–09 season, Robinson signed with the Las Vegas Wranglers of the ECHL. In 2009, Robinson was invited to the Ottawa Senators' rookie camp and made the Senators' main training camp roster on a professional tryout. Robinson was assigned to the Binghamton Senators, Ottawa's American Hockey League affiliate. Robinson split the season between Binghamton and the Elmira Jackals of the ECHL.

After the 2009–10 season spent in the minors, Robinson decided to move to Europe to further his career. Robinson signed with the Norwegian club Sparta Warriors. After a good season with Sparta, Robinson moved to the Swedish league. Robinson played two seasons with Timra IK.

In May 2013, Robinson signed with Latvian club, Dinamo Riga of the KHL. In the 2013–14 season, Robinson impressed on Riga's blueline, contributing with 10 goals and 27 points in 54 games.

On May 3, 2014, he was signed to a lucrative two-year contract with fellow KHL competitor Dynamo Moscow.

After three seasons with Dynamo, Robinson, while still contracted, was granted free agent status from the KHL following the 2016–17 season due to the club's debt on July 4, 2017. With Dynamo unwilling to offer an improved contract, Robinson left to sign a two-year contract with CSKA Moscow the following day on July 5, 2017.

Following four seasons with CSKA, Robinson left the club as a free agent and signed a one-year deal into the 2021–22 season with rival club, SKA Saint Petersburg on September 15, 2021. In his lone season with SKA, Robinson collected 10 points through 35 regular season games. Following a conference finals defeat to former club CSKA Moscow, Robinson concluded his 13-year professional career by announcing his retirement on April 15, 2022.

International play

During the 2017–18 season, Robinson was selected to represent Canada at the 2018 Winter Olympics in Pyeongchang, South Korea. Used in a defensive depth role, Robinson contributed with 1 goal and 2 points in 6 games to help Canada claim the Bronze medal.

In January 2022, Robinson was selected to make his second Olympic appearance and play for Canada at the 2022 Winter Olympics.

Career statistics

Regular season and playoffs

International

Awards and honours

References

External links

1986 births
Living people
Alaska Anchorage Seawolves men's ice hockey players
Binghamton Senators players
Ice hockey people from Calgary
Calgary Royals players
Canadian ice hockey defencemen
HC CSKA Moscow players
Dinamo Riga players
HC Dynamo Moscow players
Elmira Jackals (ECHL) players
Las Vegas Wranglers players
Olympic ice hockey players of Canada
Ice hockey players at the 2018 Winter Olympics
Olympic bronze medalists for Canada
Medalists at the 2018 Winter Olympics
Olympic medalists in ice hockey
SKA Saint Petersburg players
Sparta Warriors players
Timrå IK players
Canadian expatriate ice hockey players in Norway
Canadian expatriate ice hockey players in Latvia
Canadian expatriate ice hockey players in Russia
Canadian expatriate ice hockey players in Sweden
Canadian expatriate ice hockey players in the United States
Ice hockey players at the 2022 Winter Olympics